Abd al-Fattāḥ (ALA-LC romanization of ) is a Muslim male given name, and in modern usage, surname. It is built from the Arabic words ʻabd and al-Fattāḥ, one of the names of God in the Qur'an, which give rise to the Muslim theophoric names.

People with this name include:

Given name
 Abd al-Fattah Abu Ghudda
 Abd al-Fattah Fumani
Abdel Fattah Yahya Ibrahim Pasha (1876–1951), Egyptian politician
Abdelfattah Amr, also known as F. D. Amr Bey (1910–after 1972), Egyptian diplomat and squash player
Abdul Fattah Ismail (1939–1986), Yemeni politician
Abdul Fatah Younis (1944-2011), Libyan soldier and politician
Abdelfattah Kilito (born 1945), Moroccan writer
Ahmed Salah Abdelfatah (born 1949), Dutch actor
Mohamed Abdelwahab Abdelfattah (born 1962), Egyptian composer
Abdulfatah Ahmed (born 1963), Nigerian banker and politician
Essam Abd El Fatah (born 1965), Egyptian football referee
Mohamed Abdelfatah (born 1978), Egyptian wrestler
Hassan Abdel Fattah (born 1982), Jordanian footballer
Karim Adel Abdel Fatah (born 1982), Egyptian footballer
Abdul Fattah Al Agha (born 1984), Syrian footballer
Abdoul-Fatah Mustafa (born 1984), Cameroonian footballer
Abdul Fatawu Dauda (born 1985), Ghanaian footballer
Basel Abdoulfattakh (born 1990), Russian footballer
Abdoul Fatah (Malagasy politician)
Alaa Abd El-Fatah, Egyptian blogger and activist
Samih Abdel Fattah Iskandar 
Samir Abdel Fattah, Yemeni short story writer, novelist and playwright
Abdel Fattah el-Sisi, Egyptian military officer and politician
Abdolfattah Soltani, Iranian human rights lawyer
Abdul-Fattah Abu-Abdullah Adelabu, Nigerian scholar of Islamic and Arabic Studies, linguist, jurist and lecturer

Surname
Randa Abdel-Fattah (born 1979), Australian writer
Israa Abdel Fatah, (born 1978), Egyptian internet activist and blogger

References

Arabic masculine given names